Bank of China Centre, or BOC Centre, is a 26-storey office building of Bank of China (Hong Kong) in Tai Kok Tsui, Kowloon, Hong Kong near Olympic station. It was developed by Sino Land in 2000, but sold to BOC (Hong Kong) at HK$1.6 billion for the back office operations in 2001.

References

Olympian City
Bank of China
Sino Group
Office buildings completed in 2000